Leningradsky (masculine), Leningradskaya (feminine), or Leningradskoye (neuter) may refer to:
Leningradsky District, name of several districts and city districts in Russia
Leningradsky (inhabited locality) (Leningradskaya, Leningradskoye), name of several inhabited localities in Russia
Leningradsky Avenue, a major avenue in Moscow, Russia
Leningradsky Rail Terminal the oldest principal railway station in Moscow, Russia
Leningrad Oblast (Leningradskaya oblast), a federal subject of Russia
Hilton Moscow Leningradskaya Hotel, a hotel in Moscow, Russia
Leningradskaya Station, a Soviet Antarctic research station
Leningradskaya railway station, former name of Streshnevo railway station in Moscow, Russia
Leningradskoye Highway, a part of M10 federal Moscow St. Petersburg highway, Russia
Leningradskoye gas field, a natural gas field in Yamalo-Nenets Autonomous Okrug, Russia